Quang Pham, a Vietnamese American businessman, veteran, author, and community leader, is noted as the first Vietnamese American to earn naval aviator's wings in the U.S. Marine Corps. His family were refugees of the Vietnam War, immigrating to the United States, where Pham served in the Marine Corps then went on to found multiple pharmaceutical companies.

Early life
Pham was born in 1964 in Saigon, South Vietnam. During the invasion of South Vietnam by the Communist North Vietnamese Army, Quang, his three sisters, and his mother left their ancestral homeland, while the Army of the Republic of Vietnam (ARVN) was defending their country and its capital city of Saigon. His father, Hoa Van Pham, a member of the Republic of Vietnam Air Force, remained in South Vietnam and was captured by the North Vietnamese Army while he was supporting the Republic of Vietnam, resulting in his twelve years in re-education/prison camps.

Education
Pham graduated from the University of California Los Angeles (UCLA), and he went on to complete Marine Corps Officer Candidate School in 1986.

Career 
Pham is noted as the second Vietnamese American to complete the Marines Officer Candidate School program and the first Vietnamese American to earn naval aviator's wings in the Marine Corps. He served 7 years of active duty, including co-piloting CH-46 helicopter MedEVac missions in the Persian Gulf War, then spent 8 years in the Reserves. After the Marine Corps, Pham switched to the pharmaceutical industry. 

In 1999, Pham founded MyDrugRep.com, later renamed to LATHIAN Systems, and served as the chairman and CEO. LATHIAN Systems was the first to create a program to send physician response data to customer relationship management systems. In 2012, D&R Communications acquired LATHIAN, leading to Pham becoming a co-partner of the new D+R LATHIAN. 

In 2010, Pham was a candidate for California's Republican nomination in the 47th Congressional District, but dropped his candidacy during the race.

In 2015, Pham founded Espero Pharmaceuticals and Jacksonville Pharmaceuticals and is currently the Chairman and CEO. Espero was called the "fastest growing company" in Northeast Florida in 2017. Due to his efforts with Espero, Pham earned the Florida EY Entrepreneur of the Year Award in 2017 and 2018. 

He has served on the boards of the Marines Memorial Association, Orange County Forum, and Chapman University Business School Board of Advisers.

Personal life 
Pham and his family immigrated from Vietnam to the United States when Pham was 10 years old and lived in California. Pham and his wife moved to Jacksonville, Florida in 2011.

Quotes
"Now talk of exiting the war in Iraq has increased. What will happen to the Iraqis who believed in us? Will we let them down too?"

Publications 
Autobiography:

 

Select op-ed Pieces: 

 Pham, Quang X. (27 June 2005). "Duty and deceit". The Boston Globe.
 Pham, Quang X. (December 30, 2006). "Ford's Finest Legacy". The Washington Post.

References

External links

From Vietnamese refugee to pilot: Memoir reflects on Nam, feelings on duty, family
Review of A Sense of Duty; My Father, My American Journey by Quang X. Pham
Espero BioPharma, a company founded in Jacksonville, looks to clinical trials to help introduce two new medications 

1964 births
Living people
Vietnamese emigrants to the United States
United States Marine Corps officers
United States Naval Aviators
University of California, Los Angeles alumni
American aviators of Asian descent